Pati Patni Aur Woh is an Indian reality television programme. It is the Indian version of The Baby Borrowers. On the programme 5 celebrity couples were tested in parenting.

The contestants were Rakhi Sawant and Elesh Parujanwala, Apoorva and Shilpa Agnihotri, Gaurav Chopra and Mouni Roy, Gurmeet Choudhary and Debina Bonnerjee along with Sachin Shroff and Juhi Parmar.

Participants

References

Indian reality television series
2008 Indian television series debuts
2009 Indian television series endings
Parenting television series
Hindi-language television shows
Indian television series based on British television series